The third series of The Only Way Is Essex, a British semi-reality television programme, began airing on 25 September 2011 on ITV2. The series concluded on 9 November 2011 and consisted of fourteen episodes. An Essexmas special aired on 20 December 2011 and is included on the Series 3 DVD. This is the first series to include Billi Mucklow, Cara Kilbey, Mario Falcone, Peri Sinclair, twins Dino and Georgio Georgiades and briefly included Mark Wright Snr, the father of Mark and Jess Wright, before he later returned in the sixth series. It is the last series to include Harry Derbidge, Kirk Norcross, Maria Fowler and Mark Wright having all appeared since the first series. The series heavily focused on the romance of Mark and Sam despite obstacles like their respective exes Lauren G and Joey, the beginning of Lucy and Mario, and Arg and Lydia facing rocky patches in their relationship.

Cast

Episodes

{| class="wikitable plainrowheaders" style="width:100%; background:#fff;"
|- style="color:white"
! style="background:#F78181;"| Seriesno.
! style="background:#F78181;"| Seasonno.
! style="background:#F78181;"| Title
! style="background:#F78181;"| Original airdate
! style="background:#F78181;"| Duration
! style="background:#F78181;"| UK viewers

|}

Ratings

References

The Only Way Is Essex
2011 in British television
2011 British television seasons